Braunwald may refer to:

 Braunwald (Glarus), a village in the canton of Glarus in Switzerland
 Eugene Braunwald (b. 1929), an  American cardiologist.
 Nina Starr Braunwald (1928–1992), an American thoracic surgeon